A very incomplete list of schools in the Netherlands

Drenthe

Assen 
CS Vincent van Gogh
Dr Nassau College

Zuidlaren 
 Harens Lyceum Zuidlaren

Flevoland

Almere 
Baken Trinitas Gymnasium
Baken Stad College
Baken Park Lyceum
International School Almere
Oostvaarderscollege
Buitenhoutcollege
Helen Parkhurst

Friesland

Sneek 
Bogerman College

Dokkum 
Dockingacollege

Gorredijk 
Burgemeester Harmsma School

Leeuwarden 
Christelijk Gymnasium Beyers Naudé

Gelderland

Arnhem 
Stedelijk Gymnasium, Arnhem
Rijnijssel, Arnhem

Barneveld 
Johannes Fontanus College, Barneveld

Bemmel 
Over Betuwe College, Bemmel
Pro College Bemmel, Bemmel

Elst 
Over Betuwe College, Elst
Lyceum Elst, Elst
Het Westeraam. Elst
Stap voor stap, Elst
Zonnepoort, Elst
Elstar, Elst
De wegwijzer, Elst
De Esdoorn, Elst

Harderwijk 
Christelijk College Nassau-Veluwe
Regionale Scholengemeenschap Slingerbos

Huissen 
Over Betuwe College, Huissen

Nijmegen 
Canisius College
Citadel College
Dominicus College
Kandinsky College
Karel de Grote College
Mondial College
Montessori College Nijmegen
Nijmeegse Scholengemeenschap Groenewoud
Pro College Nijmegen
Sint Jorisschool
Stedelijk Gymnasium Nijmegen
Stedelijk Scholengemeenschap Nijmegen
Regionaal opleidingscentrum Nijmegen

Oosterhout 

Sam Sam, Oosterhout
De Klif, Oosterhout

Zutphen 
Isendoorn College
Baudartius College
Stedelijk Lyceum
Vrije School de IJssel
Vrije School de Berkel

Groningen

Groningen 
 H.N. Werkman College
 Montessori Lyceum Groningen
 Montessori Vaklyceum
Praedinius Gymnasium
Willem Lodewijk Gymnasium
 Hanze University of Applied Sciences

Haren 
 Harens Lyceum Kerklaan
International School Groningen
Maartenscollege

Limburg

Heerlen 
Bernardinus College

Roermond 
Bisschoppelijk College Broekhin
Mavo Roermond
Lyceum Schöndeln

North Brabant

Breda 
Newmancollege

Etten-Leur 
Katholieke Scholengemeenschap Etten-Leur
Munnikenheide College

Heeswijk 
Gymnasium Bernrode

Oudenbosch 
Markland College

's-Hertogenbosch 
Algemeen Brabants College
Ds. Pierson College
Duhamel College
Groenschool Helicon
Hervion College
Jeroen Bosch College
Koning Willem I College
Luzac College
Sancta Maria Mavo
Sint Janslyceum
Stedelijk Gymnasium

Veghel 
Fioretticollege

Zevenbergen 
Markland College

North Holland

Alkmaar 
Willem Blaeu College

Amsterdam 
6th Montessori School Anne Frank
Altra College
Amstellyceum
Amsterdam International Community School
Amsterdams Lyceum
Apollo School
Augustinus College
Barlaeus Gymnasium
Berlage Lyceum
Bredero Beroepscollege
Bredero Lyceum
Bredero Mavo
Calandlyceum
Cartesius lyceum
Christelijke Scholengemeenschap Buitenveldert
Damstede
Fons Vitae Lyceum
Gerrit van der Veen College
Hervormd Lyceum Zuid
Hyperion Lyceum
Het 4e gymnasium
Ignatiusgymnasium
International School of Amsterdam
Islamitisch College Amsterdam
IVKO (Idividueel Voortgezet Kunstzinnig Onderwijs)
Metis Montessori Lyceum
Montessori Lyceum Amsterdam
Osdorpse Montessorischool
Pieter Nieuwland College
ROC van Amsterdam
Spinoza Lyceum
Vossius Gymnasium

Bergen 
European School, Bergen

Grootebroek 
Martinus College

Haarlem 
 Coornhert Lyceum
 Daaf Gelukschool
 Eerste Christelijk Lyceum
 Kennemer Lyceum
 Laurens Janszoon Koster College
 Lyceum Sancta Maria
 Mendelcollege
 Paulus Mavo
 Rudolf Steiner School
 Schoter Scholengemeenschap
 Stedelijk Gymnasium Haarlem
 Sterren College
 Teyler College
 Het Schoter
 Spaarne College

Heemstede 
Hageveld College

Hilversum 
Gemeentelijk Gymnasium
Roland Holst College
International School Hilversum

Hoorn 
Horizon College Hoorn*

IJmuiden 
Vellesan College

Krommenie 
Bertrand Russell College

Overveen 
Kennemer Lyceum

Overijssel

Enschede 
International School Twente 
Het Stedelijk Lyceum

Almelo 
Christelijke Scholengemeenschap Het Noordik

Hengelo 
Bataafs Lyceum
OSG Twickel
OSG Montessori

Zwolle 
Thomas a Kempis College, Zwolle
Thorbecke Scholengemeenschap, Zwolle 
Van der Capellen Scholengemeenschap, Zwolle
Gymnasium Celeanum, Zwolle
Het Deltion college, Zwolle

Deventer 
Etty Hillesum Lyceum
Svpo

South Holland

Delft 
Montessori Delft

Leiden 
Bonaventuracollege Boerhaavelaan
Bonaventuracollege Burggravenlaan
Bonaventuracollege Mariënpoelstraat
Stedelijk Gymnasium Leiden
Visser 't Hooft Lyceum
Universiteit Leiden

Noordwijkerhout 
Teylingen College Leeuwenhorst

Roelofarendsveen 
Bonaventuracollege Schoolbaan

Rotterdam 
Erasmiaans Gymnasium 
O.S.G. Wolfert van Borselen
Rotterdam International Secondary School
Scheepvaart en Transport College
KaosPilots NL 
Cosmicus College
Montessori Lyceum Rotterdam

Sassenheim
 Rijnlands Lyceum Sassenheim

The Hague 
The British School in the Netherlands
Gymnasium Haganum
Christelijk Gymnasium Sorghvliet
European School The Hague
De kleine Keizer
International School of The Hague
Rijnlands Lyceum Wassenaar

Oegstgeest 
Rijnlands Lyceum Oegstgeest

Voorhout
 Teylingen College loc

Voorschoten 
The British School in the Netherlands

Westland 
ISW Hoogeland

Province of Utrecht

Nieuwegein 
Anna van Rijn College

Utrecht 
UniC
Utrechts Stedelijk Gymnasium
Alfonso Corti School 
Canisius College, Utrecht
 Christelijk Gymnasium Utrecht

Woerden 
Minkema College
Kalsbeek College

Zeeland 

Netherlands
Netherlands
Schools
Schools
Schools